Period may refer to:

Common uses
 Era, a length or span of time
 Full stop (or period), a punctuation mark
Menstruation, commonly referred to as a "period"

Arts, entertainment, and media
 Period (music), a concept in musical composition
 Periodic sentence (or rhetorical period), a concept in grammar and literary style.
 Period, a descriptor for a historical or period drama
 Period, a timeframe in which a particular style of antique furniture or some other work of art was produced, such as the "Edwardian period"
 Period (Another American Lie), a 1987 album by B.A.L.L.
 Period (mixtape), a 2018 mixtape by City Girls
 Period, the final book in Dennis Cooper's George Miles cycle of novels

Mathematics
 In a repeating decimal, the length of the repetend
 Period of a function, length or duration after which a function repeats itself
 Period (algebraic geometry), numbers that can be expressed as integrals of algebraic differential forms over algebraically defined domains, forming a ring

Science 
 Period (gene), a gene in Drosophila involved in regulating circadian rhythm
  Period (periodic table), a horizontal row of the periodic table
 "Period-" or "per-iod-", in some chemical compounds, "per" refers to oxidation state, and "iod" refers to the compound containing iodine
 Unit of time or timeframe
Period (geology), a subdivision of geologic time
Period (physics), the duration of time of one cycle in a repeating event
 Orbital period, the time needed for one object to complete an orbit around another
 Rotation period, the time needed for one object to complete a revolution
 Wavelength, the spatial period of a periodic wave
Sentence (linguistics), especially when discussing complex sentences in Latin syntax

Other uses 
 Period (school), a class meeting time in schools
 Period (ice hockey), a division of play in an ice hockey game
 Accounting period, often shortened to "period" in business, an accounting timeframe analogous to a month

See also
 Duration (disambiguation)
 Full stop (disambiguation)
 Periodicity (disambiguation)
 Periodization
 List of time periods
 History by period